Ludia's shrew (Crocidura ludia) is a species of mammal in the family Soricidae. It is found in Cameroon, Central African Republic, Republic of the Congo, and Democratic Republic of the Congo. Its natural habitat is subtropical or tropical moist lowland forests.

References
 Hutterer, R. 2004.  Crocidura ludia.   2006 IUCN Red List of Threatened Species.   Downloaded on 30 July 2007.

Ludia's shrew
Fauna of Central Africa
Mammals of the Central African Republic
Mammals of the Republic of the Congo
Mammals of the Democratic Republic of the Congo
Ludia's shrew
Taxonomy articles created by Polbot